Nikoloz Basilashvili was the two-time defending champion, but lost in the first round to Roberto Bautista Agut.

Andrey Rublev won the title, his third of the 2020 season, defeating Stefanos Tsitsipas in the final, 6–4, 3–6, 7–5. Tsitsipas served for the championship at 5–4 in the third set.

Seeds

Draw

Finals

Top half

Bottom half

Qualifying

Seeds

Qualifiers

Lucky losers

Qualifying draw

First qualifier

Second qualifier

Third qualifier

Fourth qualifier

References

External Links
 Main draw
 Qualifying draw

Hamburg European Open - Singles
2020 Hamburg European Open